Igor Ivanov (Russian: Игорь Иванов, born 8 December 1976) of Russia served as Chairman and an elected volunteer member of the Eurasia Regional Scout Committee of the World Organization of the Scout Movement (WOSM).

Ivanov studied at Irkutsk State Medical University and lives in Moscow.

See also

References

External links

Scouting in Russia
Living people
1976 births
Eurasia Scout Committee members